Da Bomb is the second studio album by the hip-hop duo Kris Kross, released a year after their first album Totally Krossed Out. The group tried a hardcore/gangsta look to fit with the new style of hip-hop. The album was not as successful as Totally Krossed Out, as many fans were not impressed with the new look and style and the use of the word "nigga" and reviews were mixed. The line "I drop bombs like Hiroshima" from "Da Bomb" was edited out of the album's Japanese release and the artwork was completely changed. The album was certified platinum in the US. Three singles were released, "Alright", "I'm Real" and "Da Bomb".

Track listing
"Intro" (Dupri, Jermaine) – 0:19
"Da Bomb" featuring Da Brat (Da Brat/Dupri, Jermaine) – 4:10
"Sound of My Hood" (Dupri, Jermaine) – 2:40
"It Don't Stop (Hip Hop Classic)" (Simmons, J./Dupri, Jermaine/McDaniels, Darryl "DMC"/Kelly, Chris) – 2:56
"D.J. Nabs Break" (Dupri, Jermaine/DJ Nabs) – 1:41
"Alright" featuring Super Cat (Dupri, Jermaine) - 4:03
"I'm Real" (Dupri, Jermaine) - 3:14
"2 da Beat Ch'Yall" (Dupri, Jermaine/Kelly, Chris) – 3:41
"Freak da Funk" (Dupri, Jermaine) – 2:59
"A Lot 2 Live 4" (Dupri, Jermaine) – 2:14
"Take Um Out" (Dupri, Jermaine) – 4:35
"Alright [Extended Remix] (Dupri, Jermaine) – 6:01

Charts

Weekly charts

Year-end charts

Certifications

Samples
"Da Bomb"
"The Look of Love" by Isaac Hayes
"The Big Beat" by Billy Squier
"Alright"
"Just a Touch of Love" by Slave
"I'm Real"
"Ain't Nuthin' But a G Thang" by Dr. Dre
"Mary Jane by Rick James
"2 Da Beat Ch'yall"
"Funky Worm" by Ohio Players
"The Freeze (Sizzaleenmean)" by Parliament
"More Bounce to the Ounce" by Zapp
"Freak Da Funk"
"Free Your Mind and Your Ass Will Follow" by Funkadelic
"It Don't Stop (Hip Hop Classic)"
"Hihache" by Lafayette Afro Rock Band
"The Big Beat" by Billy Squier
"Sound of My Hood"
"Give It Away" by Red Hot Chili Peppers
"The Day The Niggaz Took Over" by Dr. Dre
"Mister Magic" by Grover Washington Jr.
"Take Um Out" 
"Kool Is Back by Funk, Inc. 
"More Bounce to the Ounce by Zapp
"A Lot 2 Live 4"
A Different World Dialogue

References

1993 albums
Kris Kross albums
Albums produced by Jermaine Dupri
Ruffhouse Records albums